Pritchardia perlmanii, the Waioli Valley pritchardia,   is a species of palm tree that is endemic to the island of Kauai in Hawaii, United States.

Etymology
The name of the plant honors two individuals; Pritchardia is dedicated to William Thomas Pritchard (1829-1907), a British official stationed in Fiji in the 19th Century (later the British consul in Fiji), an adventurer, and author of Polynesian Reminiscences in 1866. The specific epithet perlmanii honors Steven Perlman, a botanist with the National Tropical Botanical Garden who was first to notice the unique features of this species of palm.

References

perlmanii
Trees of Hawaii
Endemic flora of Hawaii
Biota of Kauai
Endangered plants
Taxonomy articles created by Polbot